Neo Sidirochori is a village and a former municipality in the Rhodope regional unit, East Macedonia and Thrace, Greece. Since the 2011 local government reform it is part of the municipality Komotini, of which it is a municipal unit. The municipal unit has an area of 120.488 km2. Population 2,778 (2011). The majority of the residents of the village descend from Greek refugees who had to flee from the village of Samakovo in Eastern Thrace after the Greek defeat in the Greco-Turkish War

References

Populated places in Rhodope (regional unit)

el:Δήμος Κομοτηνής#Δημοτική ενότητα Νέου Σιδηροχωρίου